John Francis (born 24 April 1965) is an Indian boxer. He competed in the men's featherweight event at the 1988 Summer Olympics. At the 1988 Summer Olympics, he lost to Liu Dong of China.

References

External links
 

1965 births
Living people
Indian male boxers
Olympic boxers of India
Boxers at the 1988 Summer Olympics
Place of birth missing (living people)
Featherweight boxers